Salvia purpurea is a herbaceous perennial that is native to several Mexican states and south into Guatemala, El Salvador, and Honduras. It was first described by Antonio José Cavanilles in 1793, though its use in horticulture is only recent and it is rarely sold by nurseries.

Salvia purpurea reaches up to 7 feet in height, less in width, with ovate yellow-green leaves that have serrated edges. Inflorescences begin appearing in mid-autumn, with the plant blooming into winter. The flowers are a pinkish purple-violet, in tight verticils that look like they are unbalanced on one side of the flower spike. The 0.75 inch flowers are tightly packed at the end of many flowering branches.

Notes

Plants described in 1793
purpurea
Flora of El Salvador
Flora of Guatemala
Flora of Honduras
Flora of Mexico
Taxa named by Antonio José Cavanilles